Abberley Hall School is a coeducational preparatory day and boarding school with about 160 pupils. It is located between Worcester and Tenbury, near the village of Abberley, Worcestershire, England.

History
The school began in 1878 as the Dame School in Blackheath, Kent. In 1896, it became a private school and was named Lindisfarne. The school was moved to Abberley in 1916, and the property was purchased in 1921 by Gilbert Ashton, a former pupil of Lindisfarne, who took over as headmaster and renamed it Abberley Hall. The school became a trust in 1958, and is now managed by a board of governors, as a registered charity. Pupils come from a variety of backgrounds, including families and service personnel living and working abroad, professionals from the Birmingham and Worcester areas, and traditional farming families. The pre-prep and nursery serve a more local area.

Campus
The campus comprises Abberley Hall, a Grade II* listed building and its gardens and grounds, which are also listed as Grade II on the English Heritage Register of Historic Parks and Gardens of Special Historic Interest in England. The grounds also contain the Grade II* listed Abberley Clock Tower which can be seen as far away as Clent Hill, and which was the setting for the children's book by Gene Kemp, The Clock Tower Ghost.

Curriculum
Pupils follow a curriculum that prepares them for entrance into public schools (independent schools), taking Common Entrance, Winchester Entrance or Scholarship exams. Class sizes are small, averaging 11 pupils. Most subjects have their own dedicated classrooms and there are two science laboratories and specialist facilities for computing, DT, music and PE.  The majority of pupils continue their education at Malvern College, Shrewsbury School, King's Worcester, Cheltenham College, Rugby School and Malvern St James. The school also provides for individual pupils with special needs including dyslexia or specific learning difficulties, and moderate learning difficulties.

All pupils take part in the major sports; an Astroturf pitch provides opportunities for hockey, golf, croquet, riding, fishing, archery, shooting, ricochet and climbing. The school has an indoor swimming pool.

International activities
The school runs regular trips to France, where the pupils spend time whilst at Abberley.

Notable former pupils
Geoffrey Howe, former Conservative Chancellor of the Exchequer, Foreign Secretary, Leader of the House of Commons, and Deputy Prime Minister
Timothy Eggar, former Conservative Parliamentary Under-Secretary of State for Foreign, Commonwealth and Development Affairs; and Minister for Trade and Industry
Adam Fleming, billionaire, businessman
Owen Paterson, former Conservative Member of Parliament for North Shropshire, Secretary of State for Environment, Food and Rural Affairs
Philip Dunne, sitting Conservative Member of Parliament for Ludlow
Sir Anthony Quayle, actor
Antony Beevor, author
Stephen Beattie VC, naval officer, captain of HMS Campbeltown at the St Nazaire Raid

Headmasters
Gilbert Ashton (1921–1961)
Ronnie Yates (1961–1974)
Michael Haggard (1974–1996)
John Walker (1996–2014)
Will Lockett (2014–2020)
Jonnie Besley (2020–present)

References

External links
Profile on the ISC website
Profile on the Good Schools Guide
Brief details of garden

Preparatory schools in Worcestershire
Boarding schools in Worcestershire
Educational institutions established in 1878
1878 establishments in England
Grade II* listed buildings in Worcestershire